Elixir (Joshua "Josh" Foley) is a fictional character appearing in American comic books published by Marvel Comics. The character is usually depicted as a student at the Xavier Institute.

Publication history
He first appeared in New Mutants vol. 2 #5 and was created by Nunzio DeFilippis, Christina Weir, and Keron Grant.

Fictional character biography
Josh Foley's powers first manifest during his time as a member of the anti-mutant group the Reavers. His powers initially go unnoticed by the other Reavers, and he uses them to save fellow mutant Laurie Collins. Outed as a mutant, and thrown out of his house by his parents, Josh reluctantly joins the Xavier Institute for Higher Learning and becomes Prodigy's roommate. His parents sign legal guardianship over to Dani Moonstar.

A depowered Rahne Sinclair visits the X-Mansion. Josh is instantly smitten by the new "wild child" Rahne, and sneaks out of the Institute at night to go to a bar where Rahne is playing pool. A connection is established between them as Josh shows an immediate understanding of her inner struggle. As the two kiss, Josh unconsciously restores Rahne's powers. She loses control and mortally wounds Josh. Laurie witnesses the attack and uses her pheromone powers to drive away Rahne. While he is rushed to the mansion's infirmary, Beast reveals the full potential of Josh's power: he can manipulate all the body's functions on a genetic level, and the fact that Josh only heals is simply inexperience. With Archangel, the mansion's other healer, absent, the residents resort to electrically shocking Josh awake so that he can heal himself. As an unexpected side effect, Josh turns his skin and hair to a reflective gold color. He is assigned to Dani's New Mutant squad and given the codename Elixir.

Rahne attempts to end her relationship with Josh after she becomes a teacher at the school, but Josh is persistent and they continue to see each other secretly. However, when Rahne witnesses him on a date with Laurie, she ends the relationship. Josh is depressed at first, but eventually realizes that it was for the best and pursues a relationship with Laurie. However, Wither also has a crush on Laurie, and reveals Rahne's and Josh's previous relationship to the school.

Most of the New Mutants team ostracize Elixir for his involvement with a teacher.  Eventually, the New Mutants squad's in-fighting begins to affect their ability to act as a team. Concerned with the future of her team, Wind Dancer convinces everyone to get together for a camp-out so they can work through their issues with one another.  The evening ends with Josh speaking candidly with Icarus about his disappointment over his own actions. The other members of the team overhear and he is reconciled with David and Laurie.

Decimation and Childhood's End
 
The events of House of M leaves only 27 students with their powers, including Josh. Fearing their safety, Emma Frost orders the depowered students and staff, including Josh's guardian Danielle Moonstar, to leave the institute. A bus full of depowered students is bombed by anti-mutant zealot Reverend William Stryker, killing all on board. Josh is unable to heal his dying classmates in time, and becomes severely depressed and loses confidence in his abilities. Most of the remaining students take part in a melee fight organized by Emma Frost to determine who will be members in the new group of mutant heroes in-training, the New X-Men. Despite his non-combat powers, Josh makes the team.

Caught up in his emotions over the deceased students, Josh hits a powered-down Colossus over the head with a metal beam during a training session. Furious, Emma temporarily kicks him off the team. Afterwards, Laurie is killed by a bullet fired by one of Stryker's agents. Enraged over the death of Laurie, Josh uses his power to kill Stryker. This turns Josh's golden skin into metallic black and leaves him catatonic.

When X-23 is mortally wounded and unable to heal during the final battle with Nimrod, Hellion rushes her back to the institute with help from Emma Frost, who unlocks the part of his brain which controls his powers. Julian gives a motivational speech and gets Josh to move forward with his life. Josh heals Laura, which also turns his skin back from black to gold. Shortly after it is discovered that a small part of black still remains on Josh's skin, moving from place to place. Josh states he could still kill but he will need to learn how to control his powers and use them only to heal. He approaches Beast and asks him to teach him everything there is to know about human anatomy, physiology, and biology.

 
Before the other students are teleported to Limbo, the Stepford Cuckoos help Elixir learn advanced science by taking information from the Beast's head and putting it into Josh's. This increases his power exponentially, allowing him to heal otherwise-fatal injures with a touch. He also masters his "black abilities" by being able to switch instantly from golden/healing to black/disease-causing. He begins a romantic relationship with Loa.

X-Force
Due to Elixir being a "problem" to X-Force, X-23 contacts the Stepford Cuckoos to help Rahne and erase Elixir's memories of the team, by Josh's request. However, before his memories can be erased, X-Force is interrupted and sent on a mission. Elixir joins X-Force and receives a dark-colored uniform. He helps his new team capture Vanisher, creating a deadly brain tumor on his brain. Elixir later keeps X-23 from killing herself after she becomes infected with the Legacy Virus, and helps her get rid of it.

Elixir is transported to the future, along with the rest of X-Force, by Cyclops in order to bring Cable and the mutant child back to the present. Once they arrive there Elixir is in a hysterical state over being unable to save his friends from the Leper Queen. When Vanisher is wounded by Deadpool, Josh heals him and later is led to Cable and Hope Summers. During his stay in the future, Vanisher constantly tries to get Elixir to undo his tumor only to be turned down.

Upon arriving in the present, Josh cures Nori and Julian but falls into a coma as a result of the strain. He is later sought out by Hrimhari when Wolfsbane collapses after a battle with the Frost Giants. Upon arriving on Utopia, Hrimhari makes a deal with the Norse goddess of death, Hela, when he finds out Rahne is pregnant. Unable to choose between his lover or his child to save, Hrimhari requests Hela heal Josh so that he can save Wolfsbane and their child. Elixir heals her by transferring some of her baby's strength to her to ensure that she can survive the pregnancy. He and X-Force teleport off to Genosha and once there he informs Vanisher that it is not the tumor making him sick as he removed it in their trip to the future but his stage 4 Syphilis.

Elixir faces off against Wither in a fight to the death. Elixir shifts to his black form, then reverses the effects of Wither's powers, telling Kevin he is sorry before turning him to dust. In the aftermath of Necrosha, Wolverine states that Josh has quit the team, citing he is having difficulty shifting out of his black form.

Wolverine Legacy
In the aftermath of the Death of Wolverine storyline, Elixir was captured by the same individuals that had captured X-23, Sabretooth, Daken, Lady Deathstrike and Mystique. As he was still stuck in his black form, he was unable to attempt to rouse Mystique after Sharp knocked her unconscious with the trigger words, however this proved to be unnecessary as Mystique had already recovered and was just feigning unconsciousness. When Siphon attacked the group shortly after Elixir tried to use his killing powers to stop him - however these had no effect and Josh was quickly overwhelmed. X-23 insisted that they needed to help, but Sabretooth refused and demanded Sharp release them. Sharp, his team, and the captives then scattered to escape.

Utopians
Elixir later appears as a member of the Utopians alongside Karma, Madison Jeffries, Masque, Random, and Tabitha Smith.

Death and resurrection 
Elixir later resurfaces, having joined a church group to help find himself, when he was tracked down by Sabretooth and M who feels he might be targeted by someone killing mutant healers. While there, the group is attacked by the Dark Riders, and most of the church volunteers are slaughtered.  While M and Sabretooth are busy fighting the Riders, Josh begins healing the volunteers en masse, but it was a trap to lure him out and he is shot and killed by Gauntlet.

Because of the nature of Josh's powers, he does not remain dead for long, regenerating in his grave before making his way back to Genosha. Emotionally and mentally unstable as a result of his experiences, he tests his expanding powers by torturing the Dark Riders, resurrecting them and killing them over and over again. Magneto and his team learn about his survival and track him down, eventually taking him to one of the medical centers where mutants are being treated for M-Pox. Josh is able to completely heal the mutants there, but the rush of destroying the disease ravaging him leads him to nearly drain the life from the human medical personnel, and then the X-Men when they tried to stop him. They are able to reach and stop him. Josh is taken to Xorn's retreat, in hopes the mutant can help Josh come to terms with the tragedies, and gain control of his powers.

Soon afterward he is approached by Exodus and together both travel to the Savage Land where Magneto has been fatally stabbed by Psylocke. Elixir heals Magneto anew but the master of magnetism declines their invitation to join them, and tells them he must remain "dead" for the sake of mutantkind. Elixir and Exodus then teleport to parts unknown.

Elixir and Exodus were later approached by Magneto in order to help contain the Mothervine virus, an aggressive and wildly unstable biotech enhancement tailored to engineer mutant childbirths but that also triggered secondary and tertiary mutation within mutants as well as re-trigger primary mutations in depowered mutants who lost their powers on M-Day, which was released worldwide by Miss Sinister, Havok, Emma Frost and Bastion. As Exodus teleported the trio to each Mothervine impact zone, Magneto patrolled the sites for dangers as Elixir managed to cure most people affected by the Mothervine bombs, except for those that already carried a dormant X-Gene. When Elixir was taken to the masterminds' base, he neutralized all samples of the Mothervine serum and even purged it from Jimmy Hudson's system, putting an end to the Mothervine threat once and for all. He also healed Havok's scars sustained during the Planet X.

The Five
When Professor X uses Krakoa as the home for the new mutant nation in the Pacific Ocean east of Papua New Guinea, Elixir is revealed to be part of a group known as "The Five" which is made of five specific individuals whose purpose has a significant ramifications going forward for the X-Men's survival in general. Besides Elixir, The Five is made up of Goldballs (Fabio Medina), Proteus, Tempus and Hope Summers, and they all have an important part to play in keeping mutants alive, as they are the ones responsible for the several resurrections that occurred off-panel. Through Goldballs' abilities to create golden orbs of matter which it is discovered are not just orbs of biological matter, but eggs that he can create in limitless supply, allows Proteus, who can warp reality, to make those eggs viable. They next inject into those eggs, preserved DNA of a mutant, allowing Elixir to kickstart the process of cellular replication, paving the way for a mutant embryo to grow inside the egg.
That process would take quite a bit of time of course, but Eva Bell is able to control time, so she speeds up the process. That's when Magneto explains that while each member of the group could not achieve these feats on their own, they have Hope's abilities to unify them and allow all parts to run at peak velocity and unison.

Powers and abilities
Elixir is an Omega-level mutant, capable of controlling the biological structure of any organic matter including his own body. He must be in proximity to whomever he uses his power on. Besides healing, he is capable of boosting and restoring mutant abilities, causing painful boils and welts to appear, manipulating the life-forces of others, creating tumors, curing the Legacy Virus, causing death, and cleansing the body of drugs. and later after his powers were expanded radically he can even cure the M-Pox. 
The Stepford Cuckoos telepathically copied and transferred the Beast's knowledge of anatomy, biology, and genetics into Josh's mind, allowing him the knowledge to heal virtually any malady.

Because of his control over his own biology, Elixir has proven to be very difficult to treat medically. He usually passes out after pushing his powers too far and remains in a coma for some time. Elixir is also virtually immortal as although he can be killed, his powers grant him the ability to resurrect himself, as well as the ability to be reborn into a new body. He can even regenerate on a cellular level.

Since his rebirth, Elixir's powers evolved to the point of bring people back from dead as seen as when he was able to affect the 16 million deceased mutants on Genosha at once, and although it quickly drained him out of energy and he passed out, Monet and Magneto speculated, that Elixir was fully capable of resurrecting them all but at the cost of his sanity.

He is also able to detect abnormalities in living beings: he detected techo-organic cells in Angel's body, detected Emplate in Monet's body and even sensed the effect of magical inversion on Sabretooth. When Josh started to cure the M-Pox he felt that the disease was afraid of him.

Other versions

New X-Men: Too Much Information
When David learns of a mental block within his head that prevents him from keeping the information he absorbs permanently, he asks for Emma Frost's aid in removing it. Working with Dani Moonstar, they show David a possible future outcome because of the mental blocks' removal. After leaving the Xavier Institute, David promises to help Josh find the full potential of his powers. Months later after establishing his own business, Josh is used to create a  cure to both cancer and AIDS. Although successful, it comes at the cost of his life.

House of M
In the House of M reality, Josh was an agent of S.H.I.E.L.D., serving alongside Agent Kevin Ford (Wither) as interrogator. Foley and Ford were in charge of "persuading" Cameron Hodge, a member of the Human Liberation Front, to reveal the location of his terrorist cell. Josh uses his power to "speed up the body's biological functions," and combined with Agent Ford's power, they are able to create a net effect that causes a part of the terrorist to die and then regenerate, which Foley describes as "quite painful". Before Ford and Foley begin torturing Hodge, Agent Noriko Ashida (Surge) interrupts them, prompting Ford and Foley to attack her. She incapacitates them both but Foley manages to use his power to rupture her blood vessels and cause her lungs to fill with blood.

In popular culture
 Elixir is referenced in the MC chris song, "Nrrrd Grrrl": "She's more like a wallflower, Like the one that Stryker sniped, I'm like Elixir when I'm with her, 'Cause I think I like her type."

References

External links
 Elixir at Marvel.com
 Elixir at Marvel Wiki
 Elixir at Comic Vine

Comics characters introduced in 2003
Fictional characters from New York (state)
Fictional characters with healing abilities
Fictional humanoids
Fictional murderers
Marvel Comics American superheroes
Marvel Comics mutants
Marvel Comics male superheroes
Marvel Comics characters with accelerated healing
Superheroes who are adopted
New Mutants
Characters created by Nunzio DeFilippis
Characters created by Christina Weir